Maurus Xaverius Herbst or Florian Johann Friedrich Herbst (September 14, 1701 – April 4, 1757) was a German Benedictine abbot.

Herbst was born in Pleinfeld to Franz Herbst (died 1731) and Anna Maria Clara Herbst (née Gulden). In 1704 his home town of Pleinfeld was under French occupation during the Spanish War of Succession. When the imperial troops, who had been quartered in the village, had to retreat, one of the soldiers took the young Herbst with them. He returned to his family three days later.

On September 24, 1742, Herbst was elected abbot of Plankstetten Abbey and he was consecrated on 30 September. He died on 1757 in Abenberg during an exorcism. He was buried at Plankstetten Abbey.

After him, a kindergarten and a street were named his home town of Pleinfeld and a street in Plankstetten. In the diocese of Eichstätt, there is a veneration of saints around Maurus Xaverius, as he is attributed several healings. His feast day is April 4.

References

External links 

 Maurus Xaverius Herbst 
 Maurus Xaverius Herbst 
 Maurus Xaverius Herbst 

1701 births
1757 deaths
People from Weißenburg-Gunzenhausen
Benedictine abbots
German abbots
German exorcists